Mỹ Thuận may refer to several places in Vietnam:

, a rural commune of Hòn Đất District, Kiên Giang Province
Mỹ Thuận Bridge, connecting Cái Bè District, Tiền Giang Province with Vĩnh Long City, Vĩnh Long Province